Akyar (Aqyar) is a rural locality (a village) in Kacheganovsky Selsoviet, Miyakinsky District, Bashkortostan, Russia. The population was 51 as of 2010. There are 3 streets.

Geography 
Akyar is located 25 km south of Kirgiz-Miyaki (the district's administrative centre) by road. Petropavlovka is the nearest rural locality.

References 

Rural localities in Miyakinsky District